Hutchinsonia barbata is a species of flowering plant in the family Rubiaceae. It is found in Ghana, Ivory Coast, Liberia and Sierra Leone.

References

External links 
 World Checklist of Rubiaceae

Vanguerieae
Flora of Ghana
Flora of Ivory Coast
Flora of Liberia
Flora of Sierra Leone